Ilyinovka is a rural locality (a selo) in Borisoglebsky Selsoviet of Oktyabrsky District, Amur Oblast, Russia. The population was 184 as of 2018. There are 2 streets.

Geography 
Ilyinovka is located on the left bank of the Dim River, 68 km southwest of Yekaterinoslavka (the district's administrative centre) by road. Nizhnyaya Ilyinovka is the nearest rural locality.

References 

Rural localities in Oktyabrsky District, Amur Oblast